Mayra González (born 24 November 1973) is a Mexican sprinter. She competed in the women's 4 × 400 metres relay at the 2004 Summer Olympics.

References

1973 births
Living people
Athletes (track and field) at the 1999 Pan American Games
Athletes (track and field) at the 2004 Summer Olympics
Mexican female sprinters
Olympic athletes of Mexico
Place of birth missing (living people)
Central American and Caribbean Games medalists in athletics
Pan American Games competitors for Mexico
Olympic female sprinters